Jina may refer to:
Jina (Korean name), including a list of people with the name
Jina language, Afro-Asiatic language of Cameroon
Joint Institute for Nuclear Astrophysics (JINA)
Arihant (Jainism), also called jina, a term used for human beings who have attained omniscience
Five Jinas, representations of the five qualities of the first Buddha

Locations
Jina Station, Ōigawa Railway station in Shizuoka Prefecture, Japan
Jina, Sibiu, commune in Romania

See also
 Jinnah (disambiguation)
 Gina (disambiguation)
 GNA (disambiguation)
 JNA (disambiguation)